Chatrapathy is a 2004 Tamil language action thriller film directed by Srimahesh. The film stars R. Sarathkumar and Nikita Thukral whilst Vadivelu, Mahadevan, and Adithya Menon play supporting roles. The film was released for Diwali 2004 and later re-released in Hindi under the dubbed title of The Great Chatrapathy.

Plot
Saravanan (Sarathkumar), is a bus driver and Kili (Vadivelu), is the bus cleaner in a college. He also takes care of an orphanage which is home to many children and old-aged people. Indhu (Nikita Thukral), a student of the college, tries to woo Saravanan. Meanwhile, a few rowdies are found dead. Those rowdies happened to be henchmen of Chakravarthy (Mahadevan), a local powerful politician. It is revealed that Saravanan is the man behind the murders.

A flashback is shown where Saravanan’s actual name is Chatrapathi. He is an army major and recipient of “Paramveer Chakra” award, which is considered to be one of the prestigious awards in the army. On his visit to his native village in Tamil Nadu, Chatrapathi finds that Chakravarthy has grabbed majority of the land in his village from poor farmers with plans of constructing a beer factory. Chakravarthy also troubles Chatrapathi’s widowed sister (Saranya Ponvannan) by forcing her to hand over her land where she runs a small orphanage. As Chatrapathi opposes this, Chakravarthy and his henchmen beat up Chatrapathi and his sister, following which she dies. They also demolish the orphanage, which leads to the deaths of a few children. They also finally grab the land. An angered Chatrapathi kills Chakravarthy’s henchmen and goes into hiding to escape from police, waiting for an opportunity to kill Chakravarthy.

Chakravarthy finds out that Chatrapathi is behind him for taking revenge and tries to protect himself. However Chatrapathi kills Chakravarthy in the end and surrenders to the police. The court hands over Chatrapathi to the army.

Cast

Sarathkumar as Major Chatrapathi alias Saravanan 
Nikita as Indhu
Vadivelu as Kili
Mahadevan as Chakravarthy
Adithya Menon as Siva
Saranya Ponvannan as Saravanan's sister
Pooja Lokesh as Chakravarthy's deputy
Rajesh
Ilavarasu as Deputy Commissioner
Sabitha Anand
Jasper
Madhan Bob
Pyramid Natarajan
Vasu Vikram
Singamuthu
Bonda Mani
Ravichandran as Judge
Rambha in a special appearance

Soundtrack

The music was composed by S.A. Rajkumar and Released on Star Music.

References

2004 films
2000s Tamil-language films
Films scored by S. A. Rajkumar